Vithal Krishnaji Khedkar was an Indian social reformer, one of the founders of the Prarthana Samaj in Bombay, and the author of a book later published as The Divine Heritage of the Yadavas, which was one of the earliest attempts to create a historical narrative for the Yadav caste of cowherds. His work made the case for a Yadav-Ahir narrative of descent from the god Krishna through royal dynasties. Khedkar's book was revised in 1924 by his son, the surgeon Raghunath Vithal Khedkar, and published in Allahabad in 1959.

Hailing from Ratnagiri District, and a member of the Gavli Maharashtrian caste, Khedkar was born to a family of military tradition, and became a schoolteacher, later becoming a private secretary to the Maharaja of Bhavnagar.  He married the daughter of a sardar, and she became the chief medical officer at Bhavnagar.

References

Activists from Maharashtra
Indian caste leaders
Writers from Maharashtra
Prarthana Samaj